Casper Bouman (born 2 October 1985, in The Hague) is a windsurfer from the Netherlands. Bouman represented his country at the 2008 Summer Olympics in Qingdao. Bouman took 15th place on the Men's RS:X.

Nowadays Bouman is Sports coach and Professional Surfer.

Further reading

2008 Olympics (Qingdao)

References

External links
 
 
 

1985 births
Living people
Dutch windsurfers
Dutch male sailors (sport)
RS:X class world champions
Olympic sailors of the Netherlands
Sailors at the 2008 Summer Olympics – RS:X
Sportspeople from The Hague